The 1935 Eastbourne by-election was a by-election held on 29 March 1935 for the British House of Commons constituency of Eastbourne in East Sussex.

The by-election was caused by the death of the town's Conservative Party Member of Parliament (MP) John Slater, who had been elected only three years previously, in a 1932 by-election following the death of Edward Marjoribanks.

The Conservative candidate, Charles Taylor, was returned unopposed.

References

See also 
 List of United Kingdom by-elections
 Eastbourne constituency
 1925 Eastbourne by-election
 1932 Eastbourne by-election
 1990 Eastbourne by-election

By-elections to the Parliament of the United Kingdom in East Sussex constituencies
1935 elections in the United Kingdom
1935 in England
20th century in Sussex
Unopposed by-elections to the Parliament of the United Kingdom (need citation)
Politics of Eastbourne
March 1935 events